The 13th Regiment, Tennessee Infantry was an infantry regiment from Tennessee that served with the Confederate States Army in the American Civil War. Notable battles fought in include the Battle of Shiloh, the Battle of Chickamauga and the Battle of Franklin.

Field Officers
Colonels-John V. Wright, Alfred J. Vaughn, Jr. Robert W. Pitman.

Lieutenant Colonels-Alfred J. Vaughn, Jr., William E. Morgan, Robert W. Pitman, Beverly L. Dyer.

Majors-W. E. Winfield, William Jere Crook, Peter H. Cole, Beverly L. Dyer.

Companies
Company A - Captains S.R. Brewer, F.H. Carter - "The Fayette Rifle Grays" - Men from Fayette County.

Company B - Captains Joe L. Cranberry, Ben F. Lightle, William G. Mehane - "The Macon Grays" - Men from Fayette County.

Company C - Captains John H. Morgan, E.W. Douglass, W.D. Harrison - "The Secession Guards" - Men from Shelby County.

Company D - Captains John A. Wilkins, S.R. Brewer - "The Yorkville Rifles" - Men from Gibson County.

Company E - Captains  Alfred J. Vaughan, Jr., Beverly L. Dyer, Johna A. Moody - "ThevDixie Rifles" - Men from Fayette County.

Company F - Captains John V. Wright, Dew Moore Wisdon, G.W. Churchwell - "The Wright Boys" - Men from McNairy County.

Company G - Captains W.E. Winfield, C.D. Palmore, R.F. Lanier - "The Gain's Invincibles"  - Men from Fayette County.

Company H - Captain Robert W. Pitman, Sylvester A. Munson - "The Yancey Riflemen" - Men from Fayette County.

Company I - Captains G.L. Ross, William Jere Crook, John R. Purdy - "The Forked Deer Volunteers" - Men from Henderson County, now Chester County.

Company K - Captains Samuel L. Latta, Joseh Rucks Hibbitt, Ausburn D. Brown - "The Dyer Grays" - Men from Dyer County.

Company L - Captains C.B. Jones, Richard E. Moody - "The Zollicoffer Avengers."

Citations
Co. I of the 13th Tennessee captured the national colors of the 57th Indiana Infantry at the Battle of Franklin, November 30, 1864. The flag was returned to the 57th Indiana at their reunion in Kokomo, Indiana on September 23, 1885.

See also
List of Tennessee Confederate Civil War units

References

External links
 

Units and formations of the Confederate States Army from Tennessee
Military units and formations disestablished in 1865
1865 disestablishments in Tennessee